FabricLive.54 is a 2010 DJ mix album by David Rodigan. The album was released as part of the FabricLive Mix Series.

Track listing
  Augustus Pablo - King Tubby meets Rockers Uptown - Yard Music / Rockers International
  Big Youth - Waterhouse Rock - VP
  Alborosie - Kingston Town - Greensleeves
  Etana - August Town - VP
  Chezidek - Borderline - Mideya
  Romain Virgo - Live mi Life - VP
  Cham - Ghetto Story - Warner
  Super Cat - Don Dada - Sony
  Pinchers - Bandelero - Necessary Mayhem
  Prince Alla - Bucket Bottom - Freedom Sounds
  King Tubby - Roots of Dub - Total Sounds
  Joe Gibbs & Errol T - He Prayed (Dubbed) - VP
  Tenor Saw - Ring the Alarm - Techniques
  Mr. Vegas & Konshens - Help me Praise Jahoviah - Maximum Sound
  Bitty McLean - Plead my Cause - Mideya / TAXI / Silent River
  Beres Hammond - Can you Play some More - VP
  Cadenza - Stop that Train - Headlock
  Sly and Robbie, Lenky & the Maximum Sound Crew - Black Board - Maximum Sound
  Shaggy - Church Heathen - Big Yard
  Collie Buddz - Come Around - Sony
  Million Stylez - Police in Helicopter - Necessary Mayhem

References

External links
Fabric: FabricLive.54

Fabric (club) albums
2010 compilation albums